Rafael Fonseca may refer to:
 Rafael Fonseca (physician), Mexican-American physician and researcher
 Rafael Fonseca (footballer) (born 2001), Portuguese football defender
 Rafa Fonseca (born 1992), Portuguese football forward